Monkey-ed Movies is a series of short films broadcast on the Turner Broadcasting System in the late 1990s. The films parodied popular films or television programs that were currently being broadcast on TBS with the use of costumed chimpanzees and orangutans voiced by human actors.

Ray Richmond of Variety noted that Monkey-ed Movies "proved to be clever stuff, in large part because it was short and sweet. It was just an irreverent little diversion made terrific by some dedicated training and impressive mimicry."

History
The idea for the series came from a five-minute pilot that originally aired on MTV. TBS ordered 48 segments to be produced which were run during Dinner and a Movie and in odd time slots after sporting events. However, one day when a golf tournament ran short, the station played about half an hour of Monkey'ed Movies to unexpected results. The ratings actually increased, which prompted TBS to order 13 episodes of an expanded half-hour series which would become The Chimp Channel.

Production
The American Humane Association's Film and Television Unit monitored the filming of Monkey-ed Movies, and reported:
"The chimps and orangutans are receiving a very high standard of care. The trainers use modern, humane techniques to cue and motivate the animals. . . The TBS production team has been very cooperative, has upheld the Guidelines and insures the wellbeing [sic] of the chimps during filming."

Television show
In 1999, TBS spun the popular Monkey-ed Movies series into a situation comedy entitled The Chimp Channel. The series lasted only one season and met with negative reviews criticizing its attempt to expand the already effective Monkey-ed Movies concept. The series featured a segment called Movies on Film where two critics reviewed films from the Monkey-ed Movies library and gave a non-opposable thumbs up or down.

List of Monkey-ed Movies shorts

 A Few Good Men
 Air Force One
 Alien
 Apollo 13 (two different versions)
 As Good as It Gets
 Austin Powers: International Man of Mystery
 Boogie Nights
 Braveheart
 Braves Baseball
 Caligula
 Dances with Wolves
 Die Hard
 Dinner and a Movie
 Dumb and Dumber
 The Empire Strikes Back (two different versions)
 Evita
 The Full Monty
 Forrest Gump
 The Fugitive
 Ghost
 The Godfather
 Gone with the Wind
 Good Will Hunting
 In & Out
 Interview with the Vampire
 James Bond (two different versions)
 Jaws (two different versions)
 Jerry Maguire
 L.A. Confidential
 The Lost World
 Men in Black
 Mission Impossible
 NASCAR Racing
 Planet of the Humans, a parody of Planet of the Apes
 Raiders of the Lost Ark
 Scream
 Steel Magnolias
 Terminator 2: Judgment Day (two different versions)
 Thelma & Louise
 Tin Cup
 Titanic
 Top Gun
 Twister
 Ultra Chimps (promo)
 WCW
 When Harry Met Sally...

References

 Freekland.com Monkey-ed Movies review

External links
 

TBS (American TV channel) original programming
Short film series
American short films
Parodies of films
Parodies of television shows
Chimpanzees
Television series by Studio T
1998 films